1,4,7-Triazacyclononane, known as "TACN" which is pronounced "tack-en," is an aza-crown ether with the formula (C2H4NH)3. TACN is derived, formally speaking, from cyclononane by replacing three equidistant CH2 groups with NH groups. TACN is one of the oligomers derived from aziridine, C2H4NH. Other members of the series include piperazine, C4H8(NH)2, and the cyclic tetramer 1,4,7,10-tetraazacyclododecane.

Synthesis
The ligand is prepared from diethylene triamine as follows by macrocyclization using ethyleneglycol ditosylate.
H2NCH2CH2NHCH2CH2NH2  +  3 TsCl  →  Ts(H)NCH2CH2N(Ts)CH2CHH2N(H)Ts  +  3 HCl
Ts(H)NCH2CH2N(Ts)CH2CH2N(H)Ts  +  2 NaOEt →  Ts(Na)NCH2CH2N(Ts)CH2CH2N(Na)Ts
Ts(Na)NCHH2CH2N(Ts)CH2CH2N(Na)Ts  + TsOCH2CH2OTs  +  →  [(CH2CH2N(Ts)]3  +  2 NaOTs
[(CH2CH2N(Ts)]3  +  3 H2O  →  [CH2CH2NH]3  +  3 HOTs

Coordination chemistry
TACN is a popular tridentate ligand. It is threefold symmetric and binds to one face of an octahedron of metalloids and transition metals. The (TACN)M unit is kinetically inert, allowing further synthetic transformations on the other coordination sites.  A bulky analogue of TACN, is the N,N',N"-trimethylated analogue trimethyltriazacyclononane.

Illustrative complexes
Although TACN characteristically coordinates to metals in mid- and high oxidation states,  e.g. Ni(III), Mn(IV), Mo(III), W(III), exceptions occur. To illustrate, 1,4,7-triazacyclononane reacts readily with Mo(CO)6 and W(CO)6 to produce the respective air-stable tricarbonyl compounds, [(κ3 -TACN)Mo(CO)3] and [(κ3-TACN)W(CO)3]. Both have an oxidation state of zero. After further reacting with 30% H2O2, the products are [(κ3-TACN)MoO3] and [(κ3-TACN)WO3]. Both of these oxo complexes have an oxidation state of 6. The macrocyclic ligand does dissociate in the course of this dramatic change in formal oxidation state of the metal.
The complex, [κ3-TACN)Cu(II)Cl2], a catalyst for hydrolytic cleavage of phosphodiester bonds in DNA, is prepared as follows from TACN trihydrochloride:

TACN·3HCl + CuCl2·3H2O + 3 NaOH → [(κ3-TACN)CuCl2] + 6 H2O + 3 NaCl

Mn-TACN complexes catalyze epoxidation of alkenes such as styrene using H2O2 as an oxidant in a carbonate buffered methanol solution at a pH of 8.0.  These reagents are considered environmentally benign,

[(κ3-TACN)Mn] + H2O2 + NaHCO3 + (C6H5)C2H3→ [(κ3-TACN)Mn]  + 2H2O + CO2 +  (C6H5)C2H2O

Chromium (II) sources, e.g. created by heating CrCl3.6H2O in DMSO react with TACN to form both 1:1 Cr:and 2:1 complexes,  e.g. yellow [(TACN)2Cr]3+.

References

Ethyleneamines
Chelating agents
Macrocycles
Secondary amines
Tridentate ligands